Joaquim Abranches (born 28 October 1985) is an Indian professional football player who last played as a winger for Dempo S.C. in the Goa Professional League.

Club career

Dempo
Hailing from Verna, Goa, Abranches was only 19 years old when he signed for Dempo S.C. For the next three years he was used in the Goa Professional League where he made a name for himself scoring some vital goals. He was one of Dempo’s top scorers in the Goa League and also helped Dempo to two Goa League crowns during that period. The exposure he gained playing in the Goa League helped him develop as a player.

His first big break came in the 2009-10 I-League season, the year Dempo became the national champions for a record equaling fourth time. That year saw India’s top marksman, Sunil Chhetri, donning colours for Dempo and initially Abranches had to settle for a place on the bench. But mid-way into the season, a tempting offer from Sporting Kansas City Wizards, a team from Major League Soccer, saw Sunil Chhetri suddenly annul his contract and pack his bags for USA. Left with little options, Armando Colaco started including Abranches in the first eleven on a regular basis. He scored a stunning seven goals that year, deservedly earning a call up to the India U-23 team as well.

East Bengal
In 2013, Joaquim joined the Kolkata-based East Bengal. His first competitive match was against Kalighat M.S. in the Calcutta Premier Division 2013, where he scored the 3rd goal for his side from a forward through pass of the Goan veteran Alvito D'Cunha. His first appearance in the I-league for East Bengal came against Shillong Lajong on 9 October 2013 as a substitute  for Cavin Lobo.

International
Abranches made his debut for India on 21 March 2011 against Chinese Taipei coming on in the 70th minute for N.S.Manju. Abranches scored his first goal for India against Oman on 23 February 2012.

International statistics

International Goals

Honours

India
SAFF Championship: 2011

India U23
SAFF Championship: 2009

Goa
Santosh Trophy: 2005–06

References

External links
 

1985 births
Living people
People from Verna, Goa
Footballers from Goa
Dempo SC players
India youth international footballers
India international footballers
I-League players
East Bengal Club players
Footballers at the 2010 Asian Games
Indian footballers
Association football forwards
Asian Games competitors for India
Indian Super League players
FC Pune City players
FC Goa players
Churchill Brothers FC Goa players